Hal and Roger Hunt are fictional characters appearing in the children's Adventure Series novels, by Canadian-born American author Willard Price. The sons of a world-renowned animal collector John Hunt, Hal and Roger have grown up alongside exotic and dangerous wildlife. In Amazon Adventure, the boys' literary debut, Hal is 18 years old, and Roger is 13 years old.

The boys have taken a year off school to help capture animals for their father's collection on Long Island, after which the captive specimens are sold to zoos, circuses and nature parks. Their father's wildlife business, "John Hunt – Wildlife" was renamed "John Hunt and Sons" after the boys proved themselves once again in Gorilla Adventure.

Character biography

Hal Hunt 

Hal Hunt is the typical hero: tall, handsome and muscular, but still fast on his feet despite his broad build. He has survived an attack by a Portuguese man o' war and fought and defeated a panther unarmed and single-handedly. With remarkably little practice, he learns to hold his breath underwater for more than 2 minutes while diving for pearls in the South Seas. He also has a scar on his shoulder blade caused by a spear, courtesy of Merlin Kaggs. He's the older and more mature of the two brothers, and is often left in charge of the mission when their father is absent.

Hal is also very caring and trusting. During his travels in the South Seas, he became blood brothers with a Ponapean called Omo and this bond was so strong Omo once took a bullet for him. He also reformed a character called Vic Stone in Tiger Adventure after saving his life. Hal also considers it his responsibility to look after his younger brother.

Hal possesses a near limitless store of knowledge about virtually any subject or animal species they encounter, as well as being a skilled doctor. This is because he often takes the role of narrator for the parts of the book where vast volumes of explanations are needed for what is occurring. Despite being a genius, he has a poor grasp of human nature that borders on naiveté which was best demonstrated in Cannibal Adventure, where he could not understand why Merlin Kaggs - whom he had imprisoned for life - would want to kill him.

Roger Hunt 

Roger is the archetypical little brother as he often argues with, and yet admires, Hal. Although he does not have the build of his brother, being shorter as well as more slim and wiry rather than muscular, he's strong enough to survive a direct hit from an adult silverback gorilla, temporary blinding from a spitting cobra, a fight with an octopus and a near drowning from a salt water crocodile.

Roger is a diligent practical joker who is always playing pranks on his brother Hal, many of which, like the one he played in Amazon Adventure, got out of hand and almost killed someone. Despite this Roger is not evil, just young and mischievous, with an insatiable thirst to prove his own worth.

Roger has, on four occasions, proved his manhood to his overprotective brother. The first was in African Adventure where he captures a buffalo, in Whale Adventure where he is forced to fend off a pod of killer whales, in Diving Adventure where he defeats a Mako shark and rescues a beautiful maiden in the process and in Lion Adventure where he kills a lion with nothing more than a wooden spear.

Roger has the power to attract and tame virtually any animal. This is sometimes played for laughs, such as when was attacked by ants in Amazon Adventure, or seriously when he has to take care of the valuable animals in ‘’Amazon Adventure’’. The most prominent examples of his ability is when he tames a furious man-eating lion in Lion Adventure with a few softly-spoken words. He has also tamed crocodiles, infant gorillas, polar bears and a killer whale and an elephant, to name a few, during the course of their adventures.

The Adventures of Hal and Roger 

 Amazon Adventure (1949)
 South Sea Adventure (1952)
 Underwater Adventure (1954)
 Volcano Adventure (1956)
 Whale Adventure (1960)
 African Adventure (1963)
 Elephant Adventure (1964)
 Safari Adventure (1966)
 Lion Adventure (1967)
 Gorilla Adventure (1969)
 Diving Adventure (1970)
 Cannibal Adventure (1972)
 Tiger Adventure (1979)
 Arctic Adventure (1980)

Allies 
Although the boys meet new friends in every novel, only a select few make repeat appearances. These include Captain Ike, the old World War II captain currently in command of the ship Lively Lady, and his first mate, Omo, who followed and aided the boys during their adventures across the South Seas.

Other allies given considerable mention include the team of big game hunters, initially employed by their father, who then accompanied the boys on their African adventures. One of these is Joro the chief tracker who was originally conscripted by the evil Leopard Society to kill Hal, Roger and their father but had a change of heart and joined them in the fight against the Leopard Men. Two other members of the team who are often given passing mention include Toto, Hal's gun bearer with a "grin a yard wide," and the brave Mali, who also owns a magnificent Alsatian dog named Zulu.

Enemies 

During the course of their adventures, Hal and Roger have made many enemies. These include Hal's embittered ex-school friend, Sylvester K. Inkham (nicknamed "Skink") and an angry witch doctor with no scruples. Some, through their interactions with Hal and Roger, are led to redeem their past misdeeds, while others simply suffer the consequences of their actions. Of these enemies, the "Reverend" Merlin Kaggs is the only villain who made more than one appearance.

References 

Fictional explorers
Fictional hunters
Fictional scientists
Willard Price
Characters in children's literature
Literary duos
Literary characters introduced in 1949